The ARIA Music Award for Best Indigenous Release was an award presented at the annual ARIA Music Awards. It was presented from 1987 through to 1998. Originally titled Best Indigenous Record in 1987. It was renamed Best Aboriginal/Islander Release in 1995. From 1996 it was Best Indigenous Release.

The award for Best Indigenous Release was first presented to Coloured Stone for their album Human Love. It was retired after the 1998 awards with Archie Roach winning the final award for his album Looking for Butter Boy. Roach won the award three times and Weddings Parties Anything, Yothu Yindi and Christine Anu each won it twice. In 1988 upon Midnight Oil's nomination for Best Indigenous Record, their manager Gary Morris objected to the group being put in that category by ARIA, "an Indigenous Award should go to an indigenous band."

Winners and nominees

In the following table, the winner is highlighted in a separate colour, and in boldface; the nominees are those that are not highlighted or in boldface.

References

External links

 

 
Indigenous